"Noch'" (ночь, Night) is a song by Anton Rubinstein. It appeared in German as Die Nacht ("Des Tages letztes Glühen"), a song for 2 voices & piano, Op. 48/7.

The song became popular, with new English words by Sonny Miller as "Come Back My Love"  (1941), in arrangement by Bernard Grün (sometimes mis-credited as "Green").

Recordings
Richard Tauber
John McCormack (tenor)

See also
 "Come Back My Love" The Wrens (R&B band)
"Come Back My Love" Brainstorm (EP)
"Come back my love" Gerard Joling 1991

References

1941 songs